Never Were the Way She Was is a collaborative album by Colin Stetson and Sarah Neufeld, released on April 28, 2015 by Constellation Records. It was recorded live in the studio without the use of overdubs or loops at the End of the World studio in Vermont. Neufeld and Stetson had first met in 2006 when Neufeld's Bell Orchestre shared a bill with Antibalas, who Stetson was playing with. The two artists had previously collaborated on the soundtrack to the 2013 film Blue Caprice. The album received favorable reviews and won a Juno Award.

Reception 

At Metacritic, which assigns a normalised rating out of 100 to reviews from mainstream critics, Never Were the Way She Was received an average score of 81, based on 19 reviews, indicating "universal acclaim". AllMusic reviewer Thom Jurek said that the album was too short, commenting that the songs "last only as long as they hold interest for the players, though they all create a real desire for more in the listener - which is no complaint at all." Alexander Tudor of Drowned in Sound called the album a "triumph for instrumental music" and said that Stetson and Neufeld "work perfectly; long may they continue to work together." NME reviewer Cian Traynor said that the pairing was "seamless" and that the album contained "expertly controlled energy" which "unfolds like a well-crafted score to an imagined film." Harley Brown of Spin called it a "cohesive meditation on the legacy of avant-garde greats" and said it was "an essential part of Stetson and Neufeld's own impressive canons." In his review for Pitchfork, Jayson Greene said the album was an "implicit reminder of the things that can be done with two instruments and two hands."

Never Were the Way She Was won the 2016 Juno Award for Instrumental Album of the Year. The album was also longlisted nominee for the 2015 Polaris Music Prize.

Track listing

Personnel
 Colin Stetson – tenor saxophone, bass saxophone, contrabass clarinet
 Sarah Neufeld – violin, voice
 Hans Bernhard – engineering
 Mark Lawson – mixing
 Harris Newman – mastering
 Kim Meinelt – photography
 Scott Irvine – photography

References

External links

2015 albums
Collaborative albums
Colin Stetson albums
Constellation Records (Canada) albums
Juno Award for Instrumental Album of the Year albums